Gudari may refer to:
 Gudari, Phulbani, a place near Phulbani, Kandhamal, Orissa
 Gudari, Rayagada, a town in Rayagada District, Orissa, India
 Euzko Gudarostea, an army commanded by Basque Autonomous Community (gudari being the Basque word for soldier/warrior)